Morten Morisbak Skjønsberg (born 12 February 1983) is a Norwegian former footballer. As a player Skjønsberg was a versatile defender who played anywhere across the back line. In the early years of his career, he usually played at right-back, but was later converted to central defender.

Career

Club career

Skjønsberg made his debut for Stabæk in 2002. By the end of the 2007 season, he had played 114 league games for the club. On 3 August 2008, he scored his first league goal for Stabæk, against Bodø/Glimt. On 10 January 2012 he transferred to Swedish club IFK Norrköping. He came back to Stabæk in 2014 and was an important part of the team until he retired after the 2017 season. He has the record for most league and total appearances for Stabæk.

International career
At international level, Skjønsberg played 20 times for Norway U-21, and in August 2008, he got his first call-up to the senior national team. 

On 19 November 2008, he got his first and only senior cap, when he came on as a substitute against Ukraine in Dnipropetrovsk.

Career statistics

Honours 
Stabaek
Tippeligaen: 2008
Superfinalen: 2009
1. divisjon: 2005
Norwegian Football Cup runner-up: 2008

References

External links

1983 births
Living people
Sportspeople from Bærum
Norwegian footballers
Norway international footballers
Norway under-21 international footballers
Stabæk Fotball players
Eliteserien players
Norwegian First Division players
IFK Norrköping players
Allsvenskan players
Norwegian expatriate footballers
Expatriate footballers in Sweden

Association football defenders